Blue Lake was a Chicago-based record label founded in 1954 by disc jockey Al Benson.  It specialized in blues, doo-wop, jazz, and gospel.  A subsidiary of Benson's Parrot operation, it lasted until mid-1956.  Many of the Blue Lake recordings were acquired by Chess Records.

Releases
 Blue Lake 101 Red Saunders and his Orchestra - "Summertime" b/w "Riverboat"
 Blue Lake 102 Joe Williams - "In the Evening" b/w "Tired of Moving"
 Blue Lake 103 Ann Carter - "You Oughta Quit It" b/w "Lovin' Daddy Blues"
 Blue Lake 104 King Fleming's Quintette - "One O'Clock Jump" b/w "William's Blues" (featured vocalist: Lorez Alexandria)
 Blue Lake 105 Sunnyland Slim - "Going Back to Memphis" b/w "Devil Is a Busy Man"
 Blue Lake 106 Baby Boy Warren - "Mattie Mae" b/w "Santa Fe"
 Blue Lake 107 Sunnyland Slim - "Shake It Baby" b/w "Bassology"
 Blue Lake 108  Lou Mac - "Come Back Little Daddy" b/w "Hard to Get Along With" (real name: Lou McClinton)
 Blue Lake 109 Walter Spriggs - "I'm Not Your Fool Anymore" b/w "Week End Man"
 Blue Lake 111 The Maples / Von Freeman Combo - "99 Guys" b/w "I Must Forget You"
 Blue Lake 112 The Fascinators - "Can't Stop" b/w "Don't Give My Love Away"
 Blue Lake 113 Little Willy Foster - "Falling Rain Blues" b/w "Four Day Jump" (also released on Parrot 813)
 Blue Lake 114 Lou Mac - "Slow Down" b/w "Baby"
 Blue Lake 115 The Five Chances - "Shake-a-Link" b/w "All I Want"
 Blue Lake 116 Little Papa Joe - "Looking for My Baby" b/w "Easy Lovin'"
 Blue Lake 117 Lu Mac - "I'll Never Let Him Know" b/w "Albert Is His Name"
 Blue Lake 118 Leon Tarver - "Somebody Help Me" b/w "Oh Baby I'm Blue"
 Blue Lake 119 Lou Mac - "Move Me" b/w "Take Your Trouble to a Friend"
 Blue Lake 1001 Veteran Singers - "Give It Up" b/w "The Old Account Was Settled" (also released on Parrot 1001)

See also
 List of record labels

References

External links
The Parrot and Blue Lake Labels

American record labels
Record labels disestablished in 1956
1954 establishments in Illinois
1956 disestablishments in Illinois